D'Amore may refer to:

People
Angela D'Amore, Australian politician
Caroline D'Amore, an American model, and actress
Hallie D'Amore (August 13, 1942 – December 14, 2006), American make-up artist
Scott D'Amore, Canadian wrestler *Jack D'Amore, Musician. *Danna D' Amore, Broadway National Tour Musical " CATS "

Instruments
Oboe d'amore, woodwind instrument
Viola d'amore, string instrument
Flute d'amore, woodwind instrument
Clarinet d'amore, woodwind instrument

See also
Amore (disambiguation)
De amore (disambiguation)
D Amore
Damore